CatCat is a Finnish duo that participated in the Eurovision Song Contest in 1994 with the song "Bye Bye Baby". They reached 22nd place with 11 points. Members of the duo are sisters Katja and Virpi whose original surname Kätkä is  Kätkät in plural form which sounds exactly like CatCat, hence the name.

Albums 

CatCat (1992)

Bye Bye Baby (1994)

Viides kevät (1994)

Enkeli (Angel) (1995)

Yö ja päivä (Night and day) (2001)

Parhaat (2002) (collection)

Hitit (2004) (collection)

References 

Finnish schlager groups
Eurovision Song Contest entrants for Finland
Eurovision Song Contest entrants of 1994